The Island-class is a class of Police patrol boat operated primarily by the MOD Police Clyde Marine Unit at HMNB Clyde. They are tasked with protecting high value Royal Navy ships such as the Vanguard-class submarines.  Royal Marines currently operate two ex police boats of the class Mull and Rona- these were handed over to the Royal Marines during 2013. Rona and Mull are interchangeable in their roles and can be used by both RM and MDP. The RMs also have a third vessel named Eorsa.
Mod Police Portsmouth Marine Unit also operate Gigha and Lewis. Gigha was the prototype and first of class.

Specifications
The Island-class patrol vessel has the following specifications:
Weight (full): 20,000 kg (20 tonnes)
Length: 
Width : 
Speed: 
Endurance: In excess of 
Crew: 3
Armament: Weapon mounts for GPMGs, GMGs and HMGs

Current fleet 
MoD Police 
Gigha (Portsmouth Marine Unit) 
Iona 
Skye 
Lismore 
Barra 
Harris 
Lewis (Portsmouth Marine Unit)
Jura
Tiree

Royal Marines
Mull
Rona 
Eorsa

See also
MoD Police
List of active Royal Marines military watercraft

References

External links
Image of an Island-class patrol vessel at UK Armed Forces Commentary (blogspot.ie)

Royal Marines
Military boats